Kyle Daniel Magno Estrada (born May 3, 2002), better known as KD Estrada is a Filipino actor, singer, songwriter, and composer. He is mostly known for his stint as a celebrity housemate of Pinoy Big Brother: Kumunity Season 10.

Career

2019–2020: Career Beginnings 

In 2019, he started being a Star Magic trainee and eventually released self-written single One of Many under StarPop, a subsidiary of music label Star Music.

In 2020, He appeared as a performer in the Brightlight Productions' show Sunday Noontime Live! which aired in TV5. However, after just three months on air, the show released their final episode due to low ratings and high production costs. Its timeslot was later filled by a simulcast of ASAP.

2021–present: New Projects, New Music, PBB and KDLex 
In 2021, Estrada along with other new artists were added as the new members of The Squad Plus (now The Squad 2022, formerly known as The Gold Squad, popularized from the hit TV series Kadenang Ginto), joining its original members Andrea Brillantes, Kyle Echarri, Francine Diaz, and Seth Fedelin. The Squad 2022 runs a YouTube channel with over 3.27M subscribers (as of May 2022), where they regularly post challenges, games, and song covers.

Aside from The Squad 2022, Estrada was also a part of ASAP Natin 'To'''s New Breed of Singers alongside fellow Squadmates Angela Ken, Sam Cruz, Anji Salvacion, and Diego Guttierez.

As a budding actor, Estrada appeared in Loisa Andalio and Ronnie Alonte's original iWantTFC series Unloving U. He also participated in the series' soundtrack. The series' soundtrack features his original composition Saves It which was a duet with the lead actress Loisa Andalio, as well as Kaya Pala which he performed alongside Loisa Andalio, Sam Cruz, and Anji Salvacion.

Estrada also recorded a Chinese version of Mabagal (originally by Moira Dela Torre and Daniel Padilla) with Singaporean artist Haven.

In the same year, Estrada joined Pinoy Big Brother: Kumunity Season 10, the tenth overall season of Pinoy Big Brother as part of the first batch of housemates in the Celebrity Edition, having been evicted on Day 71 alongside fellow housemate and future on-screen partner Alexa Ilacad. His entry inside the PBB House was notable for his musical contributions throughout the season, opening the discussion on mental health inside the house having experienced anxiety and depression; and the eventual closeness between him and Ilacad that grew as they consoled each other from their individual episodes inside the house—even calling the latter as his greatest takeaway from the show.

During his stay inside the house, it was revealed through iWantTFC's blue carpet event Unwrapped that he will be one of Francine Diaz' three leading men for upcoming Web series Bola Bola.

In 2022, After being evicted, he and Ilacad began to appear on a number of shows and interviews together such as IWant ASAP, Kumunity: G sa Gabi with Robi Domingo, KAPAMILYA Journeys of Hope with Father Tito Caluag, and PBB Kumu Big Arrival, where they performed with musical icon Rico Blanco. He also went back to performing in ASAP Natin 'To.

ABS-CBN launched a project for the victims of typhoon Odette—100 days of various fundraising activities starting from the 10-day By Request benefit concert. KDLex—Estrada and Ilacad's love team partnership were part of the first lineup of artists to perform. During their session, they have reached over 100,000 live viewers just from the KUMU stream alone.

Due to rising popularity, in one of the pair's ASAP Natin 'To stints, it was announced that they will headline a FanCon and the upcoming Dreamscape and iWantTFC series Run To Me(originally announced as More Than Words) which will premiere this summer.

Ahead of the KDLex concert, the pair delivered their first single Misteryo under Star Music, as well as the Pinoy Big Brother: Kumunity Season 10 - Adult Edition eviction song, When I See you Again which the pair wrote and composed together during their time in the Big Brother House. In less than 12 hours, the two singles placed at #1 and #2 respectively on the iTunes Philippines Top 100.

Shortly after the announcement, Estrada and Ilacad held the online fan concert event through KTX.ph entitled Closer: The KDLex Fan Con on the 26th of February, in time with the actress' 22nd birthday. First selling of the SVIP and VIP tickets for their concert reportedly became sold-out in just an hour. Due to high demand from fans, KTX.ph added additional tickets for the show. Shortly after, it got sold out again and several times more.

As his first acting project of the year, Estrada, alongside Francine Diaz, BGYO member Akira Morishita, and Ashton Salvador starred in iWantTFC's Web series Bola Bola. This marked the actor's first ever lead role in his career. As part of the series' soundtrack, he released another self-composed song under StarPop, Mahal Ba Kita?Ahead of the 2022 Presidential Elections in the Philippines, Estrada along with Alexa Ilacad, Angela Ken, Antenorcruz, FANA, iDolls, Janine Berdin, JM Yosures, JMKO, Jona, Anji Salvacion, Lara Maigue, Reiven Umali, and the TNT Boys took part in the release of the reimagined version of Pag-Isipan Mo Ang Boto Mo which was originally composed and recorded by Jamie Rivera.

In celebration of Star Magic's 30th anniversary and after launching SLAY, the agency is set to launch FLEX—its second digital video magazine. It aims to end toxic masculinity by promoting a new idea called modern masculinity. On the 3rd of May, in time with the actor's 20th birthday, Estrada announced over Star Magic's Instagram account that he will be the magazine's first ever cover boy.

Prior to their series, Estrada and Ilacad starred as Jamir Xyrus and Janna Gives in Don't Cry Janna, a 4-episode KUMUserye directed by Cathy Garcia-Molina.

In May the same year, KDLex's most-awaited digital series, Run To Me directed by Dwein Baltazar premiered in iWantTFC and KUMU (later in Kapamilya Channel, Kapamilya Online Live, and A2Z). Produced by ABS-CBN Entertainment, Dreamscape Entertainment, iWantTFC, and KUMU, the series also stars Malou Crisologo, CJ Navato, Karl Gabriel, Ivan Carapiet, Margaux Montana, Henz Villariz, Matty Juniosa, and Haira Palaguitto. Together with the series, the pair also dropped their soundtrack album which dominated the local iTunes chart jumping to the #1 spot upon its midnight release. Their official soundtrack album ranked atop the local album list, while five of its tracks placed in the top 10 songs chart, Hiwaga at 1st spot, followed by Palagi at 2nd, Kasi, Kung, Kahit at 3rd, Misteryo at 4th, and When I See You Again at 5th. The single versions of When I See You Again, and Misteryo also placed 6th and 8th respectively. In summation, seven out of the top 10 songs on iTunes Philippines were from the pair.

In August, Star Magic toured in the United States as part of their 30th anniversary celebration. Estrada were among the stars who staged the shows. The artists first performed in the Newport Performing Arts Theater, Resorts World Manila, followed by the US shows in Kings Theater, Brooklyn, The Warfield, San Francisco, and in the Saban Theatre, Beverly Hills.

Through their fan's support, Estrada and Ilacad landed a billboard in South Korea as the pair won the Best International Artist at IdolPick's 82nd Electronic Signboard Event, and again on the next month at its 83rd Electronic Signboard Event. IdolPick'' is a web service provided by Dong-A Ilbo where you can pick and vote for your favorite idol.

Filmography

Television/Digital

Concerts

Offline

Notes

Online

Musical Plays

Music Video Appearances

Discography

Singles

Albums

Soundtrack/Compilation Albums

Appears On

As a Featured Artist

OST

Station ID

Composition Credits

Awards and Nominations

Movies and Television Awards

Music Awards

References 

2002 births
Living people
Star Music artists
ABS-CBN personalities
Pinoy Big Brother contestants